Wakulla Beach is an unincorporated community in Wakulla County, Florida, United States.  It is located on the northern shore of Goose Creek Bay, near the Gulf of Mexico.

This was a platted town that was supposed to bring tourists and visitors to northern Florida. Only a couple of houses remain. A hotel ruin is also visible, dating to the 1920s.  There is no beach per se, a very shallow bay.  No amenities at this spot in the St. Marks National Wildlife Refuge, at the end of a very long dirt road.

Geography
Wakulla Beach is located at  (30.10917, -84.25917).

History
The town was founded in 1915 and developed by Henry Walker Sr. Said to be Florida's first subdivision, it did not bring large numbers of people to reside there.

National historic status
There is a U.S. National Historic Landmark to the north of Wakulla Beach, known as Bird Hammock. It was home to Native Americans during the first millennium AD.

References

External links
 A visit to Wakulla Beach

Unincorporated communities in Wakulla County, Florida
Tallahassee metropolitan area
Unincorporated communities in Florida